The M&T Bank Building, also known as the First Maryland Building and formerly the First National Bank Of Maryland, is a commercial high-rise in Baltimore, Maryland. The structure was completed in 1972. The M&T Bank Building is an example of modern architecture. The building currently houses offices for the M&T Bank Corporation.

See also
 List of tallest buildings in Baltimore

References

Bank buildings in Maryland
Downtown Baltimore
Office buildings completed in 1972
Skyscraper office buildings in Baltimore

Modernist architecture in Maryland